Vion is a commune in the Ardèche department in southern France. It is known for its ancient church that is dated from the 1400s. There are many local winemakers in this small town.

Population

See also
Communes of the Ardèche department

References

Communes of Ardèche
Ardèche communes articles needing translation from French Wikipedia